Persistence Tour is an annual festival tour of Europe featuring performances by hardcore bands.

Persistence Tour 2018 (January 2018)  
Hatebreed
Terror
Madball
Power Trip
Born from Pain
Broken Teeth
Insanity Alert

Persistence Tour 2017 (January 2017) 
Suicidal Tendencies
Agnostic Front
Municipal Waste
Walls of Jericho
Down to Nothing
Burn
Mizery

Persistence Tour 2016 (January 2016) 
Ignite
Terror
H2O
Iron Reagan
Twitching Tongues
Wisdom in Chains
Risk It!

Persistence Tour 2015 (January 2015) 
Sick of It All
Ignite
Walls of Jericho
Rykers
Turnstile
All for Nothing
Broken Teeth

Persistence Tour 2014 (January 2014) 
Suicidal Tendencies
Terror
Evergreen Terrace
Strife
Ramallah
Nasty
The Arrs

Persistence Tour 2013 (January 2013) 
Hatebreed
Agnostic Front
H2O
Stick to Your Guns
The Acacia Strain
Neaera

Persistence Tour 2012 (January 2012) 
Suicidal Tendencies
Biohazard
Terror
Walls of Jericho
Lionheart
Crushing Caspars

Persistence Tour 2010 (December 2010) 
Sick of It All
D.R.I.
Blood for Blood
Unearth
Evergreen Terrace
Cruel Hand
Casey Jones

Persistence Tour 2009 
Ignite
Biohazard
Agnostic Front
Death by Stereo
Walls of Jericho
Evergreen Terrace
No Turning Back

Persistence Tour 2008 
Slapshot
Sick of It All
Heaven Shall Burn
War of Ages
Terror
Energy
Born from Pain
Discipline
H2O

Persistence Tour 2007 (November–December 2007) 
Hatebreed
Agnostic Front
Ignite
Evergreen Terrace
Sworn Enemy
Death Before Dishonor

Persistence Tour 2006 
Sick of It All
Madball
Terror
Walls of Jericho
Comeback Kid
Destiny
The Distance

Persistence Tour 2005 
Hatebreed
Agnostic Front
Napalm Death
Born from Pain
Bleed the Sky
The Red Chord
Full Blown Chaos

Music festivals in Europe
Music festivals established in 2005
Punk rock festivals